Walter Hoyland (14 August 1901 – 1985) was an English professional footballer who played in the Football League for Fulham, Mansfield Town and Sheffield United.

References

1901 births
1985 deaths
English footballers
Association football forwards
English Football League players
Sheffield United F.C. players
Fulham F.C. players
Boston Town F.C. (1920s) players
Loughborough Corinthians F.C. players
Peterborough & Fletton United F.C. players
Mansfield Town F.C. players
Spalding United F.C. players